Thiemo de Bakker and Robin Haase were the defending champions but only de Bakker chose to participate, partnering Matwé Middelkoop. de Bakker failed to defend his title, losing in the quarterfinals to Guillermo Durán and Máximo González.

Johan Brunström and Andreas Siljeström won the title after defeating Guillermo Durán and Máximo González 6–1, 3–6, [10–4] in the final.

Seeds

Draw

External Links
 Main Draw

BNP Paribas Primrose Bordeaux - Doubles